John M. Voshell House is a historic home located near Smyrna, Kent County, Delaware.  It was built in about 1850, and is a two-story, five bay "L"-shaped brick dwelling with a gable roof.  The roof has a heavy cornice and wide overhang in the Italianate style. It has a Federal style entrance and Greek Revival-style porch.

It was listed on the National Register of Historic Places in 1983.

References

Houses on the National Register of Historic Places in Delaware
Federal architecture in Delaware
Italianate architecture in Delaware
Greek Revival houses in Delaware
Houses completed in 1850
Houses in Kent County, Delaware
National Register of Historic Places in Kent County, Delaware